The Indonesia International Motor Show (formerly Gaikindo Auto Expo) is an annual automotive exhibition in Jakarta, Indonesia. It is organized by Dyandra Promosindo, which is a subsidiary of Kompas Gramedia. Since 2009, the exhibition is held at Jakarta International Expo Kemayoran in Pademangan, North Jakarta.

From 1986 to 2011, the exhibition started in July. From 2012 to 2015, the exhibition started in August or September. Since 2016 (skipping 2020), the exhibition has started in February or March.

History 
It started in 1986 by the name of Gaikindo Car Exhibition. The  of Jakarta Convention Center (JCC) was the initial venue.

After changing the name into Jakarta Auto Expo in 1989, the exhibition grew significantly. The number of participants increased, even though it was postponed twice in 1992–1993 and 1997–1999 due to the government tight money policy and Asian Financial Crisis.

By the year of 2000, PT Dyandra Promosindo had been involved as the exhibition organizer handling the event which name had been changed into Gaikindo Auto Expo. As a result, the auto expo was receiving a big success by attended by 115 automotive-related companies.

As the time went by, Gaikindo Auto Expo was getting bigger and bigger. The number of participants increased, and the number of visitors had also jumped (161,089 visitors in 2005).

In 2006, Gaikindo Auto Expo started a new level of auto exhibition which was eventually becoming an international-scale exhibition by collaborating with OIC (Organisation Internationale des Constructeurs d’Automobiles) that coordinates international motor shows throughout the world. As a result, Gaikindo Auto Expo was changed into the 14th Indonesia International Motor Show, held from 21 to 30 July 2006. At the time, there were 165.984 visitors who contributed to a  transactions.

The following years – 2010, 2011 and 2013 – of IIMS were running smoothly and getting bigger and bigger. There were also vast varieties of themes that show a high-responsibility to both the development of auto technology and world environment preservation – "Eco-Technology Motoring", for instance, was the theme of the IIMS 2010. There were also "Sustainable Green Technology", "Eco-Mobility" and "Smart Vehicle Mobility" for the 2011, 2012 and 2013 IIMS themes, respectively.

2015 Indonesia International Motor Show 
The 23rd Indonesia International Motor Show was held from 20 to 30 August 2015 at Jakarta International Expo Kemayoran. It was the first time the exhibition has been split into two, the other one being Gaikindo Indonesia International Auto Show (GIIAS), which is organized by Seven Events and was held at the same time at the newer venue, Indonesia Convention Exhibition, located at Bumi Serpong Damai in Tangerang Regency. Unlike the GIIAS, since this time the Indonesia International Motor Show was no longer authorized from Gaikindo.

2016 Indonesia International Motor Show 
The 24th Indonesia International Motor Show was held from 7 to 17 April 2016. It was the first time the exhibition was held in April (and occasionally ending in early May) instead of July, August or September to avoid scheduling conflicts with GIIAS, which was held in July or August (previously, IIMS was held at the same time as GIIAS in 2015).

The 24th IIMS was opened by vice president of the Republic of Indonesia, Jusuf Kalla. At least 18 car brands participated at this exhibition. Halls B3 and C3 were occupied by Chevrolet, Daihatsu, Datsun, Honda, Hyundai, Mitsubishi, Nissan, Toyota, among many others. Halls B and C consist of a premium cars like Audi, BMW, Chrysler, Dodge, Jeep, Fiat, Mercedes-Benz, Mini and Volkswagen.

Meanwhile, there were also eight motorcycle brands that appeared at this exhibition. Hall B is Garansindo, which exhibited Ducati, Peugeot scooters, Italjet and Zero Motorcycles. While Hall C was BMW Motorrad, Honda, Yamaha and Royal Enfield.

Production car introductions 
 Honda Accord (ninth generation) (facelift)
 Honda Brio (first generation); RS and Satya (facelift)
 Honda Civic (tenth generation)
 Toyota Sienta (second generation)

2017 Indonesia International Motor Show 
The 25th Indonesia International Motor Show was held from 27 April to 7 May 2017.

Production car introductions 
 Honda CR-V (fifth generation)
 Kia Rio (fourth generation)

2018 Indonesia International Motor Show 
The 26th Indonesia International Motor Show was held from 19 to 29 April 2018.

Production car introductions 
 Suzuki Ertiga (second generation)

2019 Indonesia International Motor Show 
The 27th Indonesia International Motor Show was sponsored by Telkomsel and held from 25 April to 5 May 2019.

Production car introductions 
 DFSK Glory 560
 Honda BR-V (facelift)
 Hyundai Kona
 Suzuki Carry (2019)

2020 Indonesia International Motor Show 
The 28th Indonesia International Motor Show was planned to be held from 9 to 19 April 2020, but was suspended indefinitely due to COVID-19 pandemic. In May 2020, the organizers announced that the show would be cancelled due to an uncertain future ending of the pandemic in Indonesia; instead, they would focus on the 2021 event.

2021 Indonesia International Motor Show 
Due to COVID-19 pandemic, this year's Indonesia International Motor Show was split into two events, the IIMS Virtual, which was held virtually on its official website, and the IIMS Hybrid, which was held both in the exhibition center (in compliance with strict health protocols) and on its official website.

Virtual 
The IIMS Virtual was held from 18 to 28 February 2021 (Phase 1) and 18 March to 4 April 2021 (Phase 2) on its official website.

Hybrid 
The 28th Indonesia International Motor Show (organized as IIMS Hybrid) was held from 15 to 25 April 2021 at Jakarta International Expo Kemayoran and on its official website.

Production car introductions 
 DFSK Gelora E
 MG ZS EV
 Renault Zoe

2022 Indonesia International Motor Show 
The 29th Indonesia International Motor Show (organized as IIMS Hybrid) was planned to be held from 17 to 27 February 2022, but on 7 February 2022, it was pushed back to 31 March to 10 April 2022 due to Jakarta's Level 3 Community Activities Restrictions Enforcement as the Omicron variant cases rose during the COVID-19 pandemic.

Production car introductions 
 Hyundai Ioniq 5
 Mazda CX-5 (second generation) (facelift)

2023 Indonesia International Motor Show 
The 30th Indonesia International Motor Show (organized as IIMS BOOST., stands for Bringing Opportunity for Otomotive Society Together) was held from 16 to 26 February 2023. It was the first time the exhibition was held in February.

The 30th IIMS was opened by the president of the Republic of Indonesia, Joko Widodo. Halls A and D were occupied by automotive brands and companies such as BMW, Chery, Daihatsu, DFSK Motor, Honda, Hyundai, Indomobil Group (Audi, Citroën, Kia, Nissan and Volkswagen), MG Motor, Mitsubishi Motors, Subaru, Suzuki, Toyota and Wuling Motors. Esemka, an Indonesian automotive company, also joined this exhibition at Hall A.

Halls B3 and C3 were occupied by motorcycle brands such as Benelli, Honda, Kawasaki, KTM, Royal Enfield and Yamaha.

Production car introductions 
 Chery Omoda 5
 Esemka Bima EV
 MG 4 EV
 Subaru WRX (second generation)
 Subaru WRX wagon
 Suzuki Grand Vitara (2022)
 Toyota Corolla Cross Hybrid GR Sport
 Wuling Alvez

References

External links 
 

Auto shows
Auto shows in Indonesia
Annual events in Indonesia
1986 establishments in Indonesia
Recurring events established in 1986